Hungary competed at the 1984 Winter Olympics in Sarajevo, Yugoslavia.

Alpine skiing

Men

Biathlon

Men

Men's 4 x 7.5 km relay

 1 A penalty loop of 150 metres had to be skied per missed target.
 2 One minute added per missed target.

Figure skating

Ice Dancing

Speed skating

Women

References
Official Olympic Reports
International Olympic Committee results database
 Olympic Winter Games 1984, full results by sports-reference.com

Nations at the 1984 Winter Olympics
Winter Olympics
1984